Oligocentria pallida, the pale prominent, is a species of moth in the family Notodontidae (the prominents). It was first described by Strecker in 1899 and it is found in North America.

The MONA or Hodges number for Oligocentria pallida is 8014.

References

Further reading

 
 
 

Notodontidae
Articles created by Qbugbot
Moths described in 1899